Bata Kindai Amgoza ibn LoBagola (1877–1947) was an early 20th-century American impostor and entertainer who presented an exoticized identity as a native of Africa, when in reality he was born Joseph Howard Lee in Baltimore, Maryland. Despite an impoverished start in life and a lack of education, and a series of scandalous arrests related to homosexual activities, mainly involving underage individuals, LoBagola maintained a long and colorful career posing as an African "savage", during which he delivered lectures to many institutions and conducted public debates.

LoBagola; an African Savage's Own Story
LoBagola published some articles in Scribner's Magazine in 1929 and the publishers A.A. Knopf decided to produce a book version to be titled LoBagola; an African Savage's Own Story, in an attempt to capitalise upon the then-current vogue for "exotic customs" of "places untouched by Europe". Knopf made much of LoBagola being a "savage" from a region of Africa supposedly never visited by white people, though LoBagola described himself as a "Black Jew", claiming that he was descended from people who had fled the Holy Land following the destruction of Herod's Temple.

The book was virtually unedited and came across as a picaresque pseudo-biography, studded with LoBagola's observations of "West African" ways and his adventures in many lands.

Death
LoBagola died in Attica Prison in 1947, with eighteen months of his current sentence remaining, of a pulmonary edema. He was buried in the prison cemetery.

Popular culture
LoBagola was the subject of a 2016 episode of the Futility Closet Podcast.

External links
 Brochure for Speaking Engagements by LoBagola

References

1877 births
1947 deaths
Impostors
Literary forgeries
Writers from Baltimore
People prosecuted under anti-homosexuality laws
Vaudeville performers
American people who died in prison custody
Prisoners who died in New York (state) detention
American memoirists
African-American non-fiction writers
American non-fiction writers
20th-century African-American people